Grimpoteuthis hippocrepium is a species of octopus. It is only known from one specimen found in 1904, which was poorly preserved. Some characteristics G. hippocrepium are unknown.

Description and range
The type specimen of G. hippocrepium was found near Colombia in the eastern Pacific Ocean. This octopus has over 50 suckers on its arms, and a shell that is like a horseshoe in shape, while its body is around 80 millimeters long. It lives at about 3,332 meters deep. G. hippocrepium could be a demersal species. It is not used by humans.

References

Molluscs described in 1904 
Octopuses
Molluscs of the Pacific Ocean
Species known from a single specimen